The 2022–23 Czech First League, known as the FORTUNA:LIGA for sponsorship reason, is the 30th season of the Czech Republic's top-tier football for professional clubs since its establishment, in 1993. FC Viktoria Plzeň are the reigning champions. The season started on 30 July 2022. The first half of the season will have 16 rounds, finishing on 13 November 2022 because of the 2022 FIFA World Cup, and the other half will commence on 28 January 2023. The season is expected to end on 28 May 2023 with two extra play-out fixtures on 1 and 4 June 2023.

The season format is unchanged from last season, each team will play in the league format home and away matches. The lowest-ranked team will be relegated directly to the second league, the two teams positioned 14th and 15th will play a play-out with two teams from the second league positioned 2nd and 3rd in a home and away format. This will be the fifth season to use VAR, featuring it in all matches played. The year-to-year changes in the format of the competition are only cosmetic, the most significant change being the expansion of the number of substitutes on the substitute bench to 11.

Teams

Promotion and relegation (pre-season)
A total of sixteen teams contest the league, including fifteen sides from the 2021–22 season and the winner of last season's second league.

Team promoted to Czech First League
After being relegated in the 2020–21 season, Zbrojovka Brno returns to Czech First League as the champion of the 2021–22 Czech National Football League.

Teams relegated from Czech First League
The lowest positioned team from the last season, MFK Karviná, was relegated to the Czech National Football League. The 14th-placed Bohemians 1905 and 15th-placed FK Teplice successfully defended their spots in the first league by winning the relegation play-offs.

Locations and stadiums

Managerial changes
Ahead of the season:

During the season:

Regular season

League table

Results

Season statistics

Top scorers
Updated as of 19 March 2023.

Clean sheets
Updated as of 19 March 2023.

See also
2022–23 Czech Cup
2022–23 Czech National Football League

References

External links

2022–23 in European association football leagues
1
2022-23
Current association football seasons